Hamilton Union Presbyterian Church is a historic Presbyterian church at 2291 Western Turnpike in Guilderland, Albany County, New York.

Background
It was built in 1886 and is in the Eastlake / Stick style.  It features a large, open bell tower on the south side.  The structure incorporates buttresses to compensate for the lack of roof trusses.

It was listed on the National Register of Historic Places in 1982.

References

Presbyterian churches in New York (state)
Churches on the National Register of Historic Places in New York (state)
Queen Anne architecture in New York (state)
Churches completed in 1886
19th-century Presbyterian church buildings in the United States
Churches in Albany County, New York
National Register of Historic Places in Albany County, New York